Notorious is a 2009 American biographical drama film about the Brooklyn-based hip-hop artist Christopher "The Notorious B.I.G / Biggie Smalls" Wallace, directed by George Tillman Jr. and written by Reggie Rock Bythewood and Cheo Hodari Coker. It stars Jamal Woolard as Wallace, alongside Angela Bassett, Derek Luke, and Anthony Mackie in supporting roles. Biggie's mother, Voletta Wallace, served as producer on the film, alongside his former managers, Wayne Barrow and Mark Pitts.

Notorious dramatizes key events in Biggie's life: his criminal lifestyle, his arrest and release from prison, his relationships with Sean Combs, Tupac Shakur, Lil' Kim and Faith Evans, his involvement in the East Coast–West Coast hip hop rivalry and his drive-by-shooting murder  on March 9. 1997.

Distributed by Fox Searchlight Pictures, Notorious was released in the United States on January 16, 2009. The film received mixed reviews from critics and grossed $44.4 million on a $20 million budget.

Plot
The film opens at a party in Los Angeles on March 9, 1997. The Notorious B.I.G. is stopped at a red light when an assailant in a Chevrolet Impala pulls up next to his SUV and opens fire, the film flashes back to Biggie's childhood in 1980s Brooklyn, New York, where he was a hard-working school student before he begins dealing drugs. Christopher (The Notorious B.I.G.'s real name), now older, sells drugs at the height of the crack epidemic, hustling with his friends Damian "D-Roc" and Lil' Cease.

When his girlfriend, Jan Jackson, tells him that she is pregnant, he takes drug dealing more seriously so he can earn more money to support his growing family. Christopher eventually participates in a rap battle, where he wins, but his mother, Voletta Wallace, kicks him out of the house after finding drugs underneath his bed and also because of the fact letters were sent home about him not attending school.

Christopher gets caught with guns and drugs, and he serves nine months in jail before being bailed out. Christopher meets 16-year old Kim Jones, but Kim refuses to pursue a relationship with him due to her abusive past. After reconciling with his mother and visiting his newborn daughter, T'yanna, he records a demo under the name "Biggie Smalls", which catches the attention of Sean "Puffy" Combs, an ambitious record producer working for Uptown. Puffy promises him a record deal, but Puffy later tells Biggie that he was fired by Uptown, to their mutually shared disappointment. Soon afterwards, he and D-Roc are again arrested for possessing a gun, but D-Roc takes the blame to allow Biggie to pursue his music career.

Biggie becomes depressed when he finds out his mother has been diagnosed with breast cancer, but is cheered up when Puffy signs him to his newly established record label, Bad Boy with a $60,000 advance and he records his debut album, Ready to Die. At a Bad Boy photoshoot, Biggie meets R&B singer Faith Evans. The pair begin a relationship and get married on August 9, 1994, after only knowing each other for eight days. However, Faith catches him cheating, putting an end to the relationship. The two later reconcile, but the tensions between Biggie, Faith, Jan, and Kim continue to grow.

At a party celebrating the release of Ready to Die, Tupac Shakur attends and Biggie warns him about the people he associates with, telling him to watch the company he keeps while he's in New York. When Tupac is robbed and shot five times at Quad Studios, he blames Bad Boy. At The Source Awards in 1995, Suge Knight makes a speech dissing Bad Boy Records.

After altercations between the two rappers, the disagreement escalates into the media, who capitalize on the tension and stoke the flames of an "East Coast–West Coast feud", and attacks are made on both sides. At the 1996 Soul Train Awards in Los Angeles, Biggie receives a death threat from an unknown caller; it is one of several that he has received throughout the day. At the afterparty, Tupac and Suge Knight verbally assault Biggie, but they leave when Biggie's security detail threatens them.

A song called "Who Shot Ya?" is released by Biggie, which is interpreted as a diss song by Tupac. Biggie and Puffy claim that "Who Shot Ya?" was recorded before Tupac got shot, but the latter responds with "Hit 'Em Up" where he disses Biggie, Puffy, Junior Mafia and the rest of the Bad Boy entourage. Tupac also claims he had sex with Faith. After seeing a magazine photo of Tupac and Faith together, Biggie accuses Faith of infidelity, but she insists nothing happened between her and Tupac.

Biggie and Faith attempt to reconcile after she tells him that she is pregnant with his son, C. J. Wallace, on October 29, 1996. The rivalry between the East and West Coast continues to escalate. At a concert in Sacramento, California, Biggie gets booed. After this, Biggie performs "Who Shot Ya?". The rivalry between Biggie and Tupac continues until the latter is killed in Las Vegas, Nevada. Voletta tells Biggie that Tupac was probably killed as a result of their feud, which shakes him up. Biggie attempts to ease the tensions in his life by visiting Jan and T'Yanna more often.

Biggie and D-Roc renew their friendship after D-Roc is released from prison, and Biggie confides to him that he wants out of the rap game. However, Biggie decides to go to Los Angeles to promote his upcoming album, Life After Death, bringing D-Roc and Lil' Cease with him, along with Puff Daddy and Faith. While out in L.A., Biggie receives more death threats. After calling Lil' Kim to apologize and arrange a meeting with her, he leaves the party. The film returns to the opening scene, where Biggie is killed by an L.A assailant.

His funeral is held a few days later, where friends and colleagues mourn, along with thousands of fans, who line the streets to pay their respects. In the epilogue, Voletta self-reflects on Biggie's life, stating that while she is hurt that he was taken before his time - she finds peace in the fact that he accomplished his dream and left a lasting impact. A member of the crowd turns on a ghetto blaster which plays Biggie's song "Hypnotize", and the crowd dances as Biggie's casket is driven down the city's streets.

Cast
 Jamal Woolard as The Notorious B.I.G.
 C. J. Wallace (Biggie's real-life son)  as young Christopher Wallace
 Angela Bassett as Voletta Wallace
 Derek Luke as Sean Combs
 Anthony Mackie as Tupac Shakur
 Antonique Smith as Faith Evans
 Marc John Jefferies as Lil' Cease
 Naturi Naughton as Lil' Kim
 Kevin Phillips as Mark Pitts
 Julia Pace Mitchell as Jan Jackson
 Dennis L.A. White as Damion "D-Roc" Butler
 Edwin Freeman as Mister Cee
 Valence Thomas as DJ 50 Grand
 Sean Ringgold as Suge Knight
 Anwan Glover as Snoop Dogg
 Charles Malik Whitfield as Wayne Barrow (Biggie's manager)
 Aunjanue Ellis as Sandy
 Momo Dione as record executive

Production

Development
Antoine Fuqua was originally set to direct before director George Tillman Jr. signed on to direct the project. The film was distributed by Fox Searchlight Pictures. Producers on Notorious include Sean Combs, Voletta Wallace and Biggie's former managers Wayne Barrow and Mark Pitts.

Casting
In early October 2007, open casting calls for the role of The Notorious B.I.G. began. Actors, rappers and members of the public all participated. Rapper Beanie Sigel auditioned for the role but was not picked. Nissim Black (then known as D. Black) was also under consideration. Eventually it was announced that Jamal Woolard was cast as Biggie (he would also play Biggie in the Tupac biopic All Eyez on Me).

Other cast members include Angela Bassett as Voletta Wallace, Derek Luke as Sean Combs, Antonique Smith as Faith Evans, Naturi Naughton (formerly of 3LW) as Lil' Kim, Dennis L.A. White as D-Roc and Anthony Mackie as Tupac Shakur. An unknown actor also portrays Craig Mack in a scene as well.

Filming
Principal photography began in March 2008.

Soundtrack

A soundtrack album was released to accompany the film, although only eight of its tracks feature in the movie. The following tracks which Christopher Wallace Jr. had input on feature in the movie:

 "Born Again" (Intro)
 "Hypnotize"
 "Going Back to Cali"
 "Ten Crack Commandments"
 "Bed Stuy Brooklyn" (the film credits list this as the title, although the track appears on the soundtrack under the name "Guaranteed Raw")
 "Suicidal Thoughts"
 "Everyday Struggle"
 "It's a Demo" (the film credits list this as the title, although the track appears on the soundtrack under the name "Microphone Murderer")
 "Pimps & Macs"
 "Party and Bullshit"
 "Machine Gun Funk"
 "Unbelievable"
 "Juicy"
 "Flava in Ya Ear"
 "Big Poppa"
 "Warning"
 "I Love the Dough"
 "Get Money"
 "Gimme the Loot"
 "Who Shot Ya?"
 "Sky's the Limit"

Reception

Box office
Notorious opened on January 16, 2009, in 1,638 venues. The film earned $20,497,596 in its first weekend, ranking fourth in the domestic box office behind newcomer Paul Blart: Mall Cop, holdover Gran Torino, and other newcomer My Bloody Valentine 3D. The film closed on April 2, having grossed $36,843,682 in the domestic box office (US/Canada) and $7,528,069 internationally for a worldwide total of $44,371,751.

Critical reaction
On Rotten Tomatoes, the film has an approval rating of 52% based on 145 reviews, with an average rating of 5.57/10. The site's critical consensus reads, "A biopic that lacks the luster of its subject, Notorious is generic rise-and-fall fare that still functions as a primer for those less familiar with the work and life of the hip hop icon." At Metacritic the film has a score of 60 out of 100, based on 32 critics, indicating "mixed or average reviews". Some critics have noted that the first half of the film tells exactly the same story that the 2005 film Get Rich or Die Tryin' had.

Roger Ebert gave the film three and a half out of four stars, applauding the film focusing on Christopher Wallace and not his rapping persona.

Criticism by Lil' Kim
Lil' Kim was not happy about the promiscuous manner in which she's portrayed in the film, saying, "Regardless of the many lies in the movie and false portrayal of me to help carry a storyline through, I will still continue to carry his legacy through my hard work and music." She felt the producers were more interested in her "character" than her. Lil' Kim's scenes in the film contained a significant amount of nudity and sexuality. The film's producers, including Voletta Wallace, downplayed her comments. Purportedly, producers attempted to get Lil' Kim's input during production but she never returned calls. Producers went with stories from Wallace's friends of how she and Wallace met.

Home media
Notorious was released on Blu-Ray and  DVD on April 21, 2009. In the first three weeks, about 858,000 DVD units had been sold, bringing in $19.5 million in revenue.

See also
 All Eyez on Me
 Straight Outta Compton
 8 Mile
 Get Rich or Die Tryin'
 List of hood films

References

External links
 
 
 
 

2009 films
African-American films
2009 biographical drama films
2000s musical drama films
American biographical films
American musical drama films
Biographical films about entertainers
Films scored by Danny Elfman
Films directed by George Tillman Jr.
Films produced by Robert Teitel
Films set in Brooklyn
Films set in New York City
Films set in the 1980s
Films set in the 1990s
Films shot in New York City
Fox Searchlight Pictures films
2000s hip hop films
Hood films
Musical films based on actual events
African-American biographical dramas
The Notorious B.I.G.
Cultural depictions of Tupac Shakur
2009 drama films
Biographical films about singers
2000s English-language films
2000s American films